Kyriaki Filtisakou (born 14 August 2000) is a Greek racewalking athlete. At the age of 20 she qualified to represent Greece at the 2020 Summer Olympics in Tokyo 2021, competing in women's 20 kilometres walk, in which she finished in the 29th place.

References

2000 births
Living people
Greek female racewalkers
Athletes (track and field) at the 2020 Summer Olympics
Olympic athletes of Greece
21st-century Greek women
Athletes from Athens